Kumar Anish is an Indian yoga practitioner who began practicing yoga in 1982. He lives in Bangalore, India. He is the Chief Operating Officer of the Sikshana Foundation and founder of the GiveG Foundation. He has taught yoga and personality development in Bharatiya Vidya Bhavan.

Career in Yoga
He developed the concept of Gravitational Overhaul Principles of Invigoration, which is known as the GOPI Formula. He is the author of the book GOPI Formula, launched in Oxford Bookstore, Leela Galleria.

References

1965 births
Living people
Indian yoga teachers
Businesspeople from Kannur